2012–13 Guam Men's Soccer League, officially named Budweiser Guam Men's Soccer League due to sponsorship reason, is the association football league of Guam.

Standings

External links
FIFA
RSSSF
Soccerway

Guam Soccer League seasons
1
Guam